Events from the year 1339 in Ireland.

Incumbent
Lord: Edward III

Events

 October 29 – Ruaidhri O Ceallaigh is killed lby Cathal mac Aodh mac Eoghain O Conchobhair
 Toirdhealbach O Conchobhair marries the widow of Edmund de Burgh
 Edmond Albanach de Burgh is expelled from the western islands of Connacht to Ulster
 The Mint briefly reopens at Dublin (see 1302)
 Hostilities occur between the Anglo-Irish and Irish in Kildare, Meath and Kerry

Births

Deaths
 Ruaidri Ó Cellaigh, King of Uí Maine and Chief of the Name.

References

"The Annals of Ireland by Friar John Clyn", edited and translated with an Introduction, by Bernadette Williams, Four Courts Press, 2007. , pp. 240–244.
"A New History of Ireland VIII: A Chronology of Irish History to 1976", edited by T. W. Moody, F.X. Martin and F.J. Byrne. Oxford, 1982. .
http://www.ucc.ie/celt/published/T100001B/index.html
http://www.ucc.ie/celt/published/T100005C/index.html
http://www.ucc.ie/celt/published/T100010B/index.html

 
1330s in Ireland
Ireland
Years of the 14th century in Ireland